The Hohhot–Nanning corridor is a proposed high-speed railway in China running from Hohhot in Inner Mongolia to Nanning in Guangxi. It will pass through the cities of Taiyuan, Zhengzhou, Xiangyang, Changde, Yiyang, Shaoyang, Yongzhou and Guilin. The corridor is one of the sixteen railway lines proposed under the "eight horizontal and eight vertical" railway network introduced in 2016.

Overview 
The Hohhot–Nanning corridor is a vertically-oriented (north–south) corridor with a liner path emanating from Hohhot in Inner Mongolia. It will travel through the provinces of Shanxi, Henan, Hubei and Hunan, before terminating at Nanning in Guangxi. There are no branch lines.

Sections

See also 
 High-speed rail in China

Notes

References 

High-speed rail in China